Mohammad Najeh Balas is a retired Jordanian footballer who played as a defender.

References
 Jordanian Mohammad Balas Heads to Bahrain to Take Proficiency in Malkiya Club
 Mohammad Balas: "Professionalism Was in Favor of the Players at the Expense of Clubs"

External links
 

Living people
Jordanian footballers
People from Irbid
1982 births
Jordanian expatriate sportspeople in Bahrain
Expatriate footballers in Bahrain
Jordanian expatriate footballers
Jordanian Pro League players
Al-Hussein SC (Irbid) players
Al-Arabi (Jordan) players
Mansheyat Bani Hasan players
Al-Sareeh SC players
Al-Sheikh Hussein FC players
Bahraini Premier League players
Malkiya Club players
Association football defenders